"Thinking of You (I Drive Myself Crazy)" (titled "I Drive Myself Crazy" in the United States), is a song by American boy band NSYNC. It was released on February 22, 1999 as the seventh single in the German market and the fourth single from their self-titled debut album in the US. The track was also featured on the group's seasonal European album, The Winter Album. The song is notable as being one of the few songs where someone other than Justin Timberlake and JC Chasez sang lead vocals; Chris Kirkpatrick sings the first verse in the US version, while Chasez sang Kirkpatrick's part in the European version. It was heard once in the PEN15 episode, "First Day".

Release
The song was released on February 22, 1999 as the seventh single in the German market and the fourth single from their self-titled debut album in the US. The track was also featured on the group's seasonal European album, The Winter Album. The song is notable as being one of the few songs where someone other than Justin Timberlake and JC Chasez sang lead vocals; Chris Kirkpatrick sings the first verse in the American version, while Chasez sang Kirkpatrick's part in the European version.

Music video

Background
The video was directed by Tim Story and debuted on April 1, 1999 during an episode of TRL. The version of the video featured on 'N the Mix is adjusted to feature the US version of the song. The video shows members of the band in an asylum, Camarillo State Mental Hospital, which closed in 1997. The viewer gets to see each man's torment as he remembers the girl who put him there. Each member came up with his own storyline.

Synopsis
A flashback shows Kirkpatrick ignoring his girlfriend as he talks on the cell phone, so she gets up and leaves. He sees visions of his girlfriend walking past him. Timberlake's flashback shows him trying to give a necklace to a girl, but she returns it and leaves and embraces another guy.

Chasez sees the girl who cheated on him on TV, on a show reminiscent of The Jerry Springer Show. He gets mad and starts shaking the tv after watching it again. Lance Bass reminisces to a scene where he is plucking the petals off a flower. His girlfriend sidles up to him, pulls a few petals off, but then leaves him. Joey Fatone is with his girlfriend, when another girl walks by and kisses him.  His girlfriend slaps him and then leaves.

In the asylum, Fatone continually slaps himself in the face with a flyswatter. The scenes in the asylum gradually get more frenetic, with their normal expressions changing to crazed expressions, Chasez who attacked the TV and being restrained, Bass ripping up flowers and Fatone running around in a Superman costume. At the end the five are released, and the girls are shown being brought to the asylum instead, as the group run past and tease them.

Track listing
 "Thinking of You (I Drive Myself Crazy)" (Radio Edit) – 4:00
 "Thinking of You (I Drive Myself Crazy)" (Riprock and Alex G's Crazy Driving Club Mix) – 4:00
 "Thinking of You (I Drive Myself Crazy)" (Riprock and Alex G's Remix) – 3:26
 "Thinking of You (I Drive Myself Crazy)" (U.S. Version) – 4:00
 "Thinking of You (I Drive Myself Crazy)" (Riprock and Alex G's Smooth Haze Remix) – 3:46
 "Thinking of You (I Drive Myself Crazy)" (CD-ROM Video) – 4:11

Credits and personnel
Recording
Recorded at Trans Continental Studio, Orlando, FL

Personnel
Rick Nowles – songwriter
Allan Rich – songwriter
Ellen Shipley – songwriter
Veit Renn – producer
Joe Smith – mixing
Adam Barber – recording, mixing assistant
Tony Battagllia – guitar

Charts

Weekly charts

Year-end charts

Release history

References

1998 songs
1999 singles
Music videos directed by Tim Story
NSYNC songs
Pop ballads
RCA Records singles
Songs written by Rick Nowels
Songs written by Ellen Shipley
1990s ballads
Torch songs
Songs about loneliness